The following is a list of characters that first appeared in the Channel 4 soap opera Hollyoaks in 2008, by order of first appearance.

Kieron Hobbs

Father Kieron Hobbs was the new priest at St. Timothy's Parish Catholic Church in January 2008. He was taken in by Myra McQueen, who offered him a room without consulting any of her family. While settling into the family, he had caught the eyes of Mercedes and Michaela McQueen. Committed to his religion, he looked out for John Paul McQueen, trying to advise him against a relationship. During an argument, Kieron came out to John Paul. Following this, John Paul threatened to out Kieron if he did not tell Myra the truth, but Kieron said he was happy with his life and stopped John Paul from telling. After a failed Evissa Fashion show at the SU bar, John Paul and Kieron bonded over beer, leading to a kiss. The following day, both agreed to forget about the kiss and resumed their friendship with a game of Truth or Dare, which ended in John Paul publicly purchasing beer in his underwear. However, their relationship became strained after Kieron snapped when he found out John Paul had mentioned him to Hannah Ashworth. A few days later, John Paul seen Kieron baptising Charlie Dean. John Paul realised he could not come between Kieron and his faith, and asked him to move out. In spring 2008, John Paul and Kieron were still not over each other. Kieron made friends with Kris Fisher. John Paul could not stop thinking of him during the 10 km charity run. Following a discussion afterwards, they admitted to their feelings and slept together. Unfortunately for Kieron, their night made John Paul realise he still had feelings for Craig Dean. He told Kieron and they had a fight. Kieron went to live with Niall Rafferty. Kieron confessed his love for John Paul and said he was prepared to risk all for their relationship. While showering after having sex, they were discovered by Steph Dean and Niall and Kieron was forced to end the relationship, walking out on John Paul while Michaela hid, listening. When Michaela told Mercedes that she thought she saw Kieron cheating with Kris, Mercedes punched Kieron in the face. Kieron realised that he loved John Paul McQueen, and was willing to risk everything to be with him. Before the wedding of Max Cunningham and Steph Dean, Myra found out about John Paul and Kieron thanks to Niall. Myra then told the rest of the church at the wedding. After insulting Kieron, she was removed from the church. With approval from Steph and Max, Kieron finished the ceremony. Kieron was shattered knowing his position in the church was ruined, John Paul took this as a rejection. Kieron assured John Paul that he was his life now, and he told Father Raymond he was leaving the church. Myra, when she heard from John Paul that he and Kieron were now in an open relationship was disgusted. After Tina McQueen was in a coma due to Niall pushing her down stairs, John Paul rushed to the hospital. Niall told Kieron that he was tearing their family apart. Upset that he had caused grief for the McQueens, Kieron left for a few weeks. After time away in Aberdeen, Kieron returned and returned to his relationship with John Paul. An annoyed Niall tried to make Kieron think John Paul had spent all his time partying. Kieron had befriended Ste Hay and, while everyone else turned their back on Ste, Kieron took pity and did everything he could to help him after splitting with Amy Barnes, even risking his own life despite a phobia of heights on scaffolding when Ste threatened to commit suicide. Kieron quit his position as a priest. After realising the sacrifices Kieron had made, John Paul asked Kieron to marry him. After a moment, Kieron accepted. Myra was outraged, but soon accepted their plans. The return of Craig Dean led Kieron and John Paul to separate. Some months earlier, Myra had told Kieron about the son she had given up at birth, and by September 2008, Kieron had tracked him down. On 5 September 2008, he confronted Niall, who then poisoned Kieron's drink. During Kieron's final moments, Niall confessed to putting Tina in a coma, drugging Michaela, and making Myra discover John Paul and Kieron's love affair. After Kieron died, Niall makes it look like suicide. When John Paul returned, he found Kieron's body. He called for an ambulance. John Paul sobbed as Kieron was taken away in a body bag. John Paul was not told about Kieron's funeral as such it coincided with Carmel McQueen's wedding to Calvin Valentine and despite getting dressed to go to the funeral after being told about it by Niall, Jacqui convinced him to walk Carmel down the aisle and respect Kieron's family's wishes and pay his respects to Kieron some other time which he did a few days later at his graveside by leaving a voicemail on his phone which he deleted straight after. John Paul did not find out it was murder until Niall attempted to kill the McQueens in October 2008.

Pauline Hay

Pauline Hay played by Jane Hogarth, made her first on-screen appearance in January 2008. She was introduced as the mother of Ste Hay (Kieron Richardson). During Ste's teenage years, Pauline married Terry Hay who beat both her and Ste. After Ste got out of a juvenile facility, he moved in with Amy Barnes (Ashley Slanina-Davies) and had nothing to do with his family until Pauline showed up for his 18th birthday. She asked him to move back so Terry would stop hitting her. Ste refused. A few months later, Pauline returned, saying Terry was gone and she was on the wagon. She found out that Ste and Amy were lying about Amy's daughter Leah Barnes having leukaemia, and she demanded the money they had received. She went to a fund-raiser with Amy and got drunk. After taking money from the fund-raiser, Pauline left, telling Ste he had no right to judge her. Pauline returned in April 2008, arriving at Ste's flat drunk. She passed out. Ste became angry and woke her up wanting to know why she was such a bad mother. Pauline blurted out that she wished she had never had him. In February 2009, she arrived for Leah's second birthday. She found out that Ste and Amy had split up and that she was not Leah's grandmother. The next day she stole £200 from the till of Il Gnosh when Ste's back was turned.

Pauline returns to Hollyoaks in October 2012 after Ste's boyfriend Doug Carter (PJ Brennan) calls her wanting Ste to have some of his family around for their wedding. Pauline tries to convince Ste that she has changed but quickly reveals that she hasn't and calls Ste a 'queer'. Pauline leaves once again after Ste's ex-boyfriend Brendan Brady (Emmett J. Scanlan) pays her, causing Doug to realise her real intentions as she leaves the deli with a smug look. In 2013, Tony Hutchinson (Nick Pickard) is in hospital receiving treatment for testicular cancer. While he is there he meets Pauline, who reveals that she is suffering from terminal cancer and does not want Ste to know she is dying. Tony agrees to keep her secret but decides to tell Ste as Pauline hurts her ankle and needs someone to care for her. Ste is rattled by the news and doesn't know how to react. Ste later feels he shouldn't care about Pauline dying because of the way she had treated him. Despite this, he later goes to her flat. He finds her in her bedroom appearing frail. Ste later agreed to allow Pauline to move in with him and Sinead O'Connor (Stephanie Davis) in her final months to care for her. Whilst Ste and Tony were helping pack up Pauline's stuff, Pauline was eager for a box to be binned. Ste, however, was unaware it was for the bin and brought it anyway. Back at his flat, he looked in the box and discovered it was several birthday cards from his father that Pauline had kept from him growing up. In June 2013, Pauline decided to leave Hollyoaks, And made her final appearance on 5 August 2013, as the character was killed off.

Roger Kiddle

Roger Kiddle is a Physics lecturer who befriended Elliot Bevan and took an interest in Sarah Barnes. Elliot let Roger sleep in his room while he was busy, and walked in on Roger and Sarah in bed, which helped drive Elliot to a nervous breakdown. When he recovered, he threatened to tell The Dean about it. Meanwhile, Sarah was disgusted by Roger's behaviour towards Elliot and was shocked when she met his wife Jennifer. In spite of Roger's pleas for her silence, Sarah told Jennifer the truth, Jennifer poured her wine over Roger's head and walking out. Sarah began a relationship with Roger, mostly to annoy her father over the age difference. Zoe Carpenter told Sarah that Roger had made a pass at her so Sarah ended the relationship for good.

Eli

Eli showed up on 8 April 2008 and surprised old friend Barry "Newt" Newton. Newt and Eli met in foster care when Newt was 8 and Eli was 12, and the pair had kept in contact ever since. Eli was AWOL from the army and Newt agreed to hide him in his room. He was mentioned before his appearance when Newt and Lauren Valentine discovered the body of Sean Kennedy. Since arriving, Eli began making Newt do pranks, however, the small pranks eventually got more serious, to the level of making a smoke-bomb and planting it in The Loft, and trashing Evissa, which began to scare Newt who did not want to go along with Eli, who made him. Nobody other than Newt interacted with Eli.

On 20 June, Lauren found videos that Newt made, of him performing actions that Eli had supposedly done. Finally, whilst Newt and Eli were chanting 'Eli's gonna get ya', Eli disappeared and it was revealed that he never existed. He was Newt's alternate identity, acting out all Newt's thoughts. Newt was then diagnosed with Schizophrenia, and Eli was an audible hallucination caused by this. While in hospital, Newt told Lauren the full story. Eli had been a real person who had been Newt's friend at the children's home. However, on 25 October 2002, Newt's 10th birthday, Eli had had enough of years of foster care and hanged himself. Newt found the body a couple of hours later and was scarred for life. Eli returned in December 2008 after Newt stopped taking his medication. He managed to stir things between Newt and Lauren, which ended up in Lauren going to hospital. Eli left when Lauren burnt his belongings, and Newt threw him out. When he opened the door, Eli was gone.

It was announced Eli would return in September 2009. Newt stopped taking his medication and a vicious attack on Gaz Bennett made him feel like no one believed him. Due to both reasons, Eli returned. Newt Made a friend called Rae, who was suicidal. Eli took an instant disliking to her, taking over Newt's body to attack her however Newt managed to take control before any real harm was done. Newt and Rae decided to commit suicide together, to free themselves, however Rae was revealed to be another persona due to Newt's schizophrenia. Ready to jump into a dockland, Newt pushed in Eli, who did not resurface.

Ravi Roy

Ella Richardson

Ella Richardson, played by Erin Palmer, is the daughter of Mandy Richardson (Sarah Jayne Dunn), she was born off screen in 2007 when Mandy left following the death of her baby daughter Grace Hutchinson. 

In June 2008, Mandy brought Ella to Hollyoaks for her step-brother Max Cunningham’s (Matt Littler) wedding to Steph Dean (Carley Stenson). Max was fatally struck by a car by a drunken Niall Rafferty (Barry Sloane) after the wedding, so Mandy and Ella stayed for the funeral. Mandy took Ella and left in December 2008 after embarking on an affair with Warren Fox (Jamie Lomas), which was discovered by his fiancée Louise Summers (Roxanne McKee). Mandy later returned to Ella’s father Mark, but left him and Ella again in 2010 after re-igniting her affair with Warren. Mandy again returned to Mark and Ella in September 2011 after her attempted reconciliation with her ex-husband Tony Hutchinson (Nick Pickard) failed to work out.

By 2017, Mandy had taken Ella as she left Mark again, reuniting with her ex-boyfriend Luke Morgan (Gary Lucy). Luke, however, was an alcoholic and Ella was taken into care by social services shortly after Mandy, Luke and Ella made a permanent return to the village. Mandy struggled without Ella and kidnapped her from her foster home, but Mandy later returned her. Ella returned to Mandy's care in January 2018.

Mandy and Luke later separated after Mandy embarked on an affair with Darren Osborne (Ashley Taylor Dawson). Mandy began a relationship with Darren and she, Darren and Ella moved into the flat. Ella befriended Charlie Dean (Charlie Behan), who Darren had become close to through his marriage with Charlie's guardian and aunt Nancy Osborne (Jessica Fox). In October 2019, Charlie and Ella snuck onto the construction site for Cunningham's Grande Bazaar and into the underground tunnels. They were trapped when the tunnels caved in, but managed to escape.

In October 2020, Ella discovered that Charlie was dealing drugs for Jordan Price (Connor Calland), as part of Victor Brothers’ (Benjamin O’Mahony) gang. Ella was also forced to deal drugs after being blackmailed into doing so by Juliet Nightingale (Niamh Blackshaw). In December 2020, Victor attempted to force Ella to smuggle drugs inside of her body, but refused to do so. As she and Charlie attempted to hide from the dealers in The Hutch, Jordan found them under the table and Ella fatally stabbed him in Charlie's defence.

Charlie told the police that he had stabbed Jordan, with Mandy convincing Ella to go along with the lie until Nancy discovered a letter from Charlie in Ella's possession that proved that he was innocent. Charlie was subsequently released and Ella was arrested and charged without bail. Ella returned to the village in August 2021, having been convicted of manslaughter and receiving a youth rehabilitation order.

Ella's relationship with Mandy became strained, and she moved in with Darren, Nancy and Charlie. Bonding over their experiences in prison, Charlie and Ella began a relationship which soon became sexual to Darren and Nancy’s horror. Ella later confessed to Mandy as she believed that she was pregnant, so Mandy had Ella take a pregnancy test which came back negative.

Max McQueen

Max McQueen (also Owen), is the son of Tina Reilly (Leah Hackett) and Russ Owen (Stuart Manning). Max appears between 2 July 2008 and 3 June 2009, portrayed by child actor Brayden Haynes-Mawdsley. It was announced on 20 July 2018 that Max would return to the series following Russ' return. Max is ten years old upon his reintroduction. Upon his reintroduction, Max is portrayed by Gabriel Lawrence. Jennifer Metcalfe, who portrays Mercedes McQueen, said that working with Lawrence was enjoyable and that he brought "a really lovely energy".

After Tina discovers she is pregnant, she agrees to let her sister Jacqui McQueen (Claire Cooper) and her partner, Tony Hutchinson (Nick Pickard), adopt her child. At her 12-week scan, Tina discovers that she is 15 weeks pregnant, meaning that Russ is the child's father. Tina tells Jacqui, who convinces Tina to stay quiet. Tina's brother, Niall Rafferty (Barry Sloane), pushes her down the stairs, causing her to give birth in a caesarean section. After learning she cannot have any more children, Tina decides to raise Max as she could not bare to give him away, creating strain between Tina and Jacqui. As Russ prepares to leave the village, Tina reveals that he is Max's father and convinces him to stay to be Max’s father. A month later, Niall kills Tina in an explosion leaving Max without a mum, so Jacqui begins raising Max, promising Russ access. She later restricts Russ access to his son, so he plans to run away with Max. As Tina's sister, Carmel McQueen (Gemma Merna) babysits Max, Russ visits him and kidnaps him. Carmel sees this, but lets them go. Max leaves the village with Russ and Justin Burton (Chris Fountain). Jacqui is devastated when she discovers that Max and his passport are missing.

Nine years later, Mercedes arranges a hen party in Magaluf, where her family are given the opportunity to meet her new fiancé. They are shocked to realise it is Russ, but Myra is delighted when he introduces her to Max. Russ and Max then move to the village with Mercedes and her son, Bobby Costello (Jayden Fox) and she brings him up as her own son.

After Max wanting to live with his aunt Nicole Owen in Greece after Russ is murdered in Greece when Mercedes starts drinking and taking out her grief on Max devastating Mercedes. He later returns in July 2019 back to the village with Nicole for his birthday party to see Mercedes and the rest of the McQueen Family.

Leila Roy

Caroline Cooper

Caroline Cooper first appeared in July 2008 as Russ Owen's girlfriend. Caroline told Russ that she worked for MI6 and had to be careful in public. Russ spotted Caroline in a postperson's outfit and realised that she lied. She told Russ that she did not want him to know in case he thought that she was boring. She apologised and they continued their relationship. On 26 September, Russ and Caroline decided to travel the world. Russ then stayed to be with Max. Caroline left on her own. She sent Russ a postcard later in the year.

Eamon Fisher

Eamon Fisher was the father of Kris and Malachy Fisher. On arrival, his refusal to accept Kris' sexuality lead to an argument. Despite attempts by Elliot Bevan to get the pair to reconcile, Eamon decided to leave, unable to come to terms with his son's sexuality. However, before he left, he collapsed in the car park of The Dog and died of alcohol poisoning. Upon finding the body, Darren Osborne disposed of Eamon's wallet, and passed the body off as Jack Osborne in order to claim life insurance and solve his family's financial issues. After hearing of Jack's "death", and unaware of his father's demise, Kris contacted Eamon in hopes of reconciling. When Jack's faked death came out in October, Eamon's body was sent home where he was cremated in Hollyoaks Later. That night Kris and Malachy took his urn to the pub and forgot to take it back. The following day, just after Kris came out as a bisexual cross-dresser, the brothers got into a punch up with a few of others which only ended when Erin walked in to see Malachy smash Eamon's urn over one man's head, scattering them everywhere.

Jean Snow

Jean Snow is the adoptive mother of Niall Rafferty seen in September 2008. She appeared when Kieron Hobbs was asked by Myra McQueen if he could help locate the son she gave up at birth. Jean showed Kieron a photograph of Niall with his "girlfriend", Steph Cunningham. Jean later arrived in Hollyoaks, when Niall discovered Kieron knew his secret.

Mark Gascoyne

DI Mark Gascoyne is a colleague of Calvin Valentine. He is portrayed by Craig Russell. Mark is a DI who works alongside Calvin. He slept with Jacqui McQueen during a breakdown of her relationship with Tony Hutchinson. He became closer to Carmel McQueen. Calvin found condoms in Carmel's purse. He became suspicious of Mark and Carmel's relationship. Carmel confessed that she bought them for Lauren Valentine and Barry Newton. Mark raided The Loft and made Calvin beat up Warren Fox. Mark upset Louise Summers and Ravi Roy by insinuating that Warren was dead. Warren then beat up Mark as revenge. In December 2008, Mark and Calvin arrested Tony Hutchinson for sleeping with 15-year-old Theresa McQueen. In May 2009, he became aware of Calvin's deals with Warren. Calvin told him everything and that he had plans to get Warren to confess to Sean Kennedy murder. Calvin recorded a confession of both Sean and Louise's murders. However the recorder had broken and the evidence was lost. Calvin was then sacked. In June, Mark made enquiries about Warren's murder and searched for suspect Justin Burton. He then arrested Clare Devine.

Matt Crosby

Matt Crosby was a man who Hannah Ashworth met during the MTV European Music Awards. Matt's limousine ruined Hannah's dress so he gave her his shirt to wear. After the awards, Matt returned to Hollyoaks village to see Hannah, when they began flirting. Her brother Rhys was shocked when Hannah decided to have a good time and took him upstairs. Justin Burton, who had begun developing feelings for Hannah, caught Matt flirting with another girl. He immediately forced Matt to split up with Hannah and leave. He has not been seen since.

Bel Roy

Bel Roy is the mother of Ravi, Leila, Ash and Anita Roy who first appeared in November 2008 with husband Gov. The character left in October 2009.

Bel arrived as a new hairdresser at Evissa. She was favoured by Louise Summers when she got rid of Cindy Cunningham. Bel has made friends with Louise Summers and Carmel Valentine. After Warren Fox killed Louise, Bel recommended to Warren that Carmel should be the new manager. When she discovered Justin Burton accidentally asked Leila to move in, Bel took Leila's clothes to Justin's flat and accused him of just wanting sex. He stated that they are committed. Justin and Leila however split up. On 24 April 2009, the Roys discovered that Anita poured bleach over her legs. Worried, Govinda assumed she did it because she was ashamed of her race. When the school was vandalised, Govinda accused Theresa McQueen, but it was actually Anita, who was fed up of people taking advantage and not listening to her. After Ravi was put in a coma, Ash, who caused it, revealed to Anita that she was adopted by Gov and Bel. Ash tried to lie his way out of it, however Ravi had overheard him telling her. The Roys then disowned Ash. Anita revealed that Gov had covered up her when she stole exam papers, resulting in Gov having to resign. He then got a new job in Middlesbrough, which he and Bel moved to alone.

Govinda Roy

Govinda "Gov" Roy first appeared in November 2008 as the father of Ash, Leila, Ravi, and Anita Roy. He became the new headmaster of Hollyoaks High. The character left in October 2009.

The new headmaster of Hollyoaks High, Gov had high expectations of daughter Leila, who told him she was studying law at college but was studying art. Govinda found out but accepted her decision. His credit card was stolen by Barry "Newt" Newton and Lauren Valentine. Zak Ramsey started working as a trainee P.E. teacher so Govinda showed him around. In March 2009, he suspended Theresa McQueen when he caught her stealing Lydia Hart's purse. Theresa and Carmel McQueen moved in with the Roys when rats infested the McQueens house. On 24 April, the Roys discovered that Anita poured bleach over her legs. Gov was ashamed of her and assumed she was ashamed of her ethnicity. Anita threw a brick through the school's window wearing Theresa's coat, Gov then assumed it was her until Anita admitted she did it. Govinda discovered in May that Anita stole an exam paper containing answers. He sent her home, but found out she did not plan to look at them. After Ravi was put in a coma due to his aneurysm, it was revealed by Ash that Bel and Gov are not Anita's biological parents and had adopted her as a baby. Subsequent to this, Anita went out of control and told Leila and her teacher Des that Gov had not reported her when she stole exam papers. Gov decided to resign. He then got another job in Middlesbrough, where he moved with Bel.

Ash Roy

Ash Roy is the eldest of the Roy siblings. He first appeared in November 2008, the last of his family to arrive. Upon his arrival, Ash appeared as a wealthy, smug businessman. The character left on 11 September 2009 when he was disowned by parents Govinda and Bel for telling sister Anita she was adopted.

Ash started flirting with Mandy Richardson and opened a take-away in Hollyoaks, Relish. He also bought Tan & Tumble from Tony Hutchinson. After buying it, Jacqui McQueen, who was the manager, was never told and was upset. In January 2009, Relish was burnt down by racist Gaz Bennett.

Ash began a relationship with Hannah Ashworth and became a love-rival of Justin, who had developed feelings for her. In March, Hannah and Justin became closer and Ash was jealous. After Josh Ashworth decided to sell his motor bike, Justin made an offer. Ash found out and bought it at a higher price. Justin succeeded in buying it by selling Ste Hay's games console. Ash bought another bike and challenged Justin to a race, which took place in April. Ash tampered with Justin's bike so he could win, but Hannah got on the bike. She fell off and ended up in hospital. Ash told everyone it was Justin who tampered with the bike, but under questioning from Calvin Valentine, he admitted he did not see Justin tampering with it. Leila found out the truth and told Hannah, who then dumped him. To make them think Justin was bad for Hannah, Ash planted food in her room to make it look like she was having a relapse. He told Suzanne Ashworth that Hannah was not eating. After Warren Fox's death, Ash began using Warren's phone to text his foster brother Spencer Gray. Acting as Warren, he told Spencer that he was still alive and needed him to sell The Loft. Spencer sold The Loft to Ash, who was then discovered by Calvin and Sasha Valentine.

Ash started putting Ravi up for illegal street fights, unaware he had been diagnosed with a cerebral aneurysm. Ash found out, yet let Ravi go ahead with a fight, which left him slightly blinded. Leila made Ash accept the blame for it. Ash employed Loretta Jones at Tan & Tumble and both he and Ravi began to have feelings for her. After Loretta saw Ravi's violent side on a date, Ash flirted with her and went in for a kiss, which Ravi caught. Ravi then, despite his condition, signed for another illegal fight. Ash, Loretta, Anita, Kris and Bel all rushed to stop him. After doing so, angry Ravi taunted Ash, which resulted in him punching him, making Ravi fall into a coma. Leila and Anita blamed Ash, who then tried to comfort Anita who was worried she could inherit the aneurysm, however Ash told her she could not, as she was adopted. Ash manipulated Anita into keeping quiet about what he told her, and, to prove it, showed her a birth certificate listing a different mother. Anita told the Roys she knew she was adopted. When confronted, Ash told Bel, Gov and Leila that Anita had found the birth certificate and came to him, however Ravi, who awakened from his coma, told them he was awake when Ash told Anita. Leila, Ravi and Gov then told Ash to leave. Ash pleaded with Bel to choose either him or Ravi. Realising he had ruined the family, Bel also told Ash to leave. Ash then tried to convince Anita and Leila to help his parents forgive him, but both refused. Leila then revealed to Gilly Roach that Ash had planted food in Hannah Ashworth's room to make it look like she had taken a relapse. Ash then closed down Relish and Tan & Tumble and left Hollyoaks.

Shelly Newton

Shelly Newton is the biological drug addicted mother of Barry "Newt" Newton. Newt was taken away from Shelly and put into care after she neglected him.

In 2008, Shelly decided not to agree to Newt's adoption by Jack and Frankie Osborne. She then appeared when she met Newt. Shelly asked him to move away with her, which he agreed, however after later discovering she lied about no longer taking drugs. Newt then left Shelly and returned to his foster parents. Shelly returned on 21 June 2010 briefly, along with her new baby, Jensen. She convinced Newt that she had kicked drugs because of her recent pregnancy. She sent Newt out to get the takeaway, and when he returned, she had left the baby behind, with a note saying she was going for a job interview. When she did not return for over a day, Newt began to believe she wasn't coming back, and planned to run off with baby Jensen and girlfriend Rae Wilson. Before they could leave, Shelley returned and told Newt she had found a job in Scotland. Newt agreed to move away with her.

Archie Carpenter

Anita Roy

Theresa McQueen

Spencer Gray

Yvonne Summers

Yvonne Summers, played by Lysette Anthony, is the mother of Louise Summers who first appeared on 23 December for Louise's wedding to Warren Fox. Following Louise's murder, Yvonne files a missing persons report, unaware Warren had killed her. Yvonne appears in Hollyoaks in May 2009, where she turns up at Warren's flat and tells him that Calvin Valentine informed her that Warren killed Louise's ex-husband Sean Kennedy and also Louise. Yvonne does not know whether to believe Warren or Calvin, until Frankie and Darren Osborne tell her about how Warren framed Frankie's son Jake Dean for Sean's murder. Yvonne leaves, returning days later, where Warren finally confesses to killing Louise. A devastated Yvonne attacks Warren, who retreats to The Loft.

Other characters

References

, Hollyoaks
2008